Extracting the Core is Martyr's only live album. It was recorded in Summer 2001 in Rouyn-Noranda, Canada and was released by Skyscraper Music. The album came in a multimedia disk which contained the songs, live photos, and videos.

Track list

Personnel
 Daniel Mongrain  – clean vocals, guitar
 Pier-Luc Lampron - guitar
 François Mongrain - bass, death growls
 Patrice Hamelin - drums, percussion

References

Galy Records albums
2001 live albums